The Hutchinson Blue Dragons are the sports teams of Hutchinson Community College located in Hutchinson, Kansas, United States. They participate in the National Junior College Athletic Association (NJCAA) and in the Kansas Jayhawk Community College Conference.

Sports

Men's sports
Baseball
Basketball
Cross country
Football
Track & field
Golf

Women's sports
Basketball
Cross country
Soccer
Softball
Track & field
Volleyball

Facilities
Hutchinson Community College has five facilities.
 Fun Valley Softball Complex – home of the Blue Dragons softball team
 Gowans Stadium – home of the Blue Dragons football team
 Hobart–Detter Field – home of the Blue Dragons baseball team
 Hutchinson Sports Arena – home of the Blue Dragons men's and women's basketball teams, and volleyball team
 USD 308 Salthawk Sports Complex – home of the Blue Dragons soccer team; also shared with USD 308 Hutchinson Public Schools

Coaches
 Men's Sports
 Baseball – Ryan Schmidt
 Basketball – Tommy DeSalme
 Cross Country – Justin Riggs
 Football – Drew Dallas
 Track and Field – Robert Spies
 Golf - Chris Young
 Women's Sports
 Basketball – John Ontjes
 Cross Country – Justin Riggs
 Soccer – Sammy Lane
 Softball – Jaime Rose
 Track and Field – Robert Spies
 Volleyball – Delice Downing

Notable athletes
 Andy Dirks, outfielder for the Detroit Tigers (retired)
 Darius Johnson-Odom, professional basketball player for the Springfield Armor
 Cordarrelle Patterson, professional football player for the Atlanta Falcons
 Mike Zagurski, former reliever for the Philadelphia Phillies, Arizona Diamondbacks, Pittsburgh Pirates and New York Yankees
 Alvin Kamara,  professional football player for the New Orleans Saints
 Markus Golden, professional football player for the Arizona Cardinals 
 De'Vondre Campbell, professional football player for the Green Bay Packers 
 Shaun Hill, former professional football player for the Minnesota Vikings, San Francisco 49ers, Detroit Lions, and St. Louis Rams

See also
 Hutchinson Sports Arena

References

External links
 

Sports teams in Kansas